William Sturrock, Chancellor of Down Cathedral from 1781 to 1796, was Archdeacon of Armagh from  1797 until 1814.

Notes

18th-century Irish Anglican priests
19th-century Irish Anglican priests
Archdeacons of Armagh